Naruja is a daba (small town) in the Ozurgeti Municipality of Guria in western Georgia with the population of 2148 (2014).

See also
 Guria

References

Cities and towns in Guria